The 24th United States Colored Infantry Regiment was an infantry regiment that served in the Union Army during the American Civil War. The regiment was composed of African American enlisted men commanded by white officers and was authorized by the Bureau of Colored Troops which was created by the United States War Department on May 22, 1863.

Service
The 24th United States Colored Infantry Regiment was organized at Camp William Penn near Philadelphia, Pennsylvania beginning January 1, 1865 for three-year service under the command of Colonel Orlando Brown.

The regiment moved to Washington, D.C., May 5, and served duty at Camp Casey until June 1. At Point Lookout, Maryland, guarding prisoners until July 16. Moved to Richmond, Virginia, and served duty in the Sub-District of Roanoke, Headquarters at Burkesville, until September. Moved to Richmond, and served there until mustered out of service on October 1, 1865.

Commanders
 Colonel Orlando Brown

See also

 List of United States Colored Troops Civil War Units
 United States Colored Troops

References
 Dyer, Frederick H. A Compendium of the War of the Rebellion (Des Moines, IA: Dyer Pub. Co.), 1908.
Attribution

External links
 Regimental flag of the 24th United States Colored Infantry

United States Colored Troops Civil War units and formations
Military units and formations established in 1865
Military units and formations disestablished in 1865